Charles Wilbur Creighton (August 31, 1885 – June 23, 1947) was an American politician and lawyer.

Creighton was born on a farm in Wayne County, Illinois. He went to the public schools. Creighton studied at McKendree University, Southern Illinois University Carbondale and the Northern Illinois University College of Law. He had taught in the Wayne County schools. Creighton practiced law in Fairfield, Illinois and served as state's attorney for Wayne County. He served on the board of education and was president of the board of education. Creighton was a Democrat. He served in the Illinois House of Representatives in 1943 and 1944. Creighton died in Fairfield, Illinois from a heart attack.

Notes

External links

1885 births
1947 deaths
People from Wayne County, Illinois
Southern Illinois University Carbondale alumni
McKendree University alumni
Northern Illinois University alumni
Educators from Illinois
Illinois lawyers
District attorneys in Illinois
School board members in Illinois
Democratic Party members of the Illinois House of Representatives
20th-century American politicians
20th-century American lawyers